Gordon Fletcher was an Australian rugby league footballer who played in the 1930s.  He played for Eastern Suburbs and North Sydney in the NSWRL competition.

Background
Fletcher played in the local country competitions before joining Eastern Suburbs.  He played representative football for Western NSW and Far Western NSW in 1927 and 1928.

Playing career
Fletcher made his first grade debut for Eastern Suburbs in Round 1 1928 against University at the Royal Agricultural Society Grounds.  Eastern Suburbs finished 2nd on the table that year and eventually reached the grand final against arch rivals South Sydney who were looking at winning their 4th premiership in a row.

Fletcher played at five-eighth in the match as Easts were comprehensively beaten 26–5 in the final played at the Royal Agricultural Society Grounds.  Fletcher was also selected to play for New South Wales in 1928 and featured in 4 games.

Fletcher played with Easts up until the end of 1932 before departing the club.  Due to the residency rules at the time, Fletcher sat out the 1933 season before signing with North Sydney for the 1934 season.  Fletcher only managed to play 5 games with Norths before retiring.

References

Sydney Roosters players
North Sydney Bears players
New South Wales rugby league team players
Rugby league players from Sydney
Rugby league five-eighths
Rugby league halfbacks
Rugby league centres
Year of birth missing
Year of death missing
Place of birth missing
Place of death missing